Rota is a stratovolcano located in the western part of Nicaragua.

See also
 List of volcanoes in Nicaragua

References 

Mountains of Nicaragua
Stratovolcanoes of Nicaragua
León Department